Radio Rossii (Radio of Russia) is the primary public radio station in Russia.

History 
Radio Rossii began broadcasting on December 10, 1990.  The radio station is part of the state-owned unitary enterprise VGTRK, which also includes television channels Russia-1, Russia-2, Russia-24, Carousel, and Russia-K, as well as radio stations Yunost, Mayak, Kultura and Vesti FM.

Broadcast 
Radio Rossii is classified as an information and light entertainment station.  It is one of the state's information channels, meant to appeal to a wide audience with varying tastes. It's included in the first multiplex of digital TV broadcasting DVB-T2. Local state affiliates (GTRKs) broadcast regional programs on Radio Rossii.

Distribution

Switch-offs 
Broadcasts in shortwave were terminated in the 2010s, and longwave broadcasts were terminated on 9 January 2014.

With about 1,500 FM transmitters, Radio Rossii has the largest FM coverage in Russia. It remains the only station with widespread OIRT-FM coverage on (65.9-74 MHz). The OIRT band is only used in the CIS countries. In populated areas across Russia, Radio Rossii can be received both on OIRT and the standard FM band on (87.5-108 MHz), and streams are also available via satellite and the internet. 

Since April 5, 2022 probably due to the conflicts, broadcasting started again on MW at 999 kHz, 24 hours a day via 1000 kW transmitter in Grigoriopol, Transnistria. This transmitter is easily received in all of Europe, North Africa and parts of Asia.

References

External links

Radio Rossii streams and regional stations (GTRK) on fmstream.org

Radio stations established in 1990
Radio stations in Russia
Russian-language radio stations
Mass media in Moscow